The 1980–81 season was Sport Lisboa e Benfica's 77th season in existence and the club's 47th consecutive season in the top flight of Portuguese football, covering the period from 1 July 1980 to 30 June 1981. Benfica competed domestically in the Primeira Divisão, Taça de Portugal and the Supertaça de Portugal, and participated in the Cup Winners' Cup after winning the Taça de Portugal in the previous season.

In the new season, Mário Wilson was replaced by Lajos Baróti. In the transfer season, major signings included António Veloso, Francisco Vital and João Alves, who returned to the club. Benfica's league campaign started with seven consecutive wins, before a first loss with Porto in the Clássico. A few days later, Benfica wins their first Supertaça de Portugal. In the Cup Winners' Cup, Benfica eliminated Altay, Dinamo Zagreb and Malmö in the first three rounds. In late November, Benfica draws with Sporting and three weeks later, with Vitória de Setúbal, lapping the first half in first place with a three-point lead. In the following weeks, Benfica won three more matches before losing another point in a draw with Penafiel, which cut his lead to two points. They reacted with four more wins, including a home win against Porto, which widened their difference to four points. Meanwhile, in Europe, Benfica defeated Fortuna Düsseldorf in quarter-finals but was knocked-out by Carl Zeiss Jena in the semis. The final two months of the Primeira Divisão saw Benfica drop points with Académico de Viseu, Vitória de Guimarães and Sporting, reducing their lead to two points. On match-day 29, a home win against Setúbal secured their 24th league title. They concluded the season by winning their 17th Taça de Portugal in a 3–1 win against Porto.

Season summary
In the previous season, Mário Wilson failed to regain the title, prolonging the drought to three years. It was the first time since 1954 that Benfica went so long without a league title. Despite winning the Taça de Portugal, he did not continue for a second year. As replacement, Benfica contacted Raymond Goethals, but he declined, so the club turned to 66-year old Hungarian Lajos Baróti. After negotiations, on 9 June, he agreed to replace Wilson. In the transfer season, Benfica signed players like António Veloso and Francisco Vital, who were regularly used by Baroti. However the transfer of Summer was the return of João Alves from France, with Benfica making a last minute offer and signing him, before Sporting, who was also interested, could. The pre-season began on 21 July, with Benfica travelling to Canada on the 28 to play the Toronto Tournament. After winning the tournament in Canada, Benfica made their presentation game on 13 August with Paris Saint-Germain, and finished the pre-season by competing in the 
Trofeo Santiago Bernabéu with Real Madrid and Dinamo Kyiv from 29 to 31 August. The match with Varzim scheduled for that weekend was postponed to 4 October.

Benfica started their season with the preliminary round of the Cup Winners' Cup with Altay, beating 4–0 at home.
Domestic competition began on 24 August in an away win against Boavista. Benfica kept on winning in the following weeks, eliminating Dinamo Zagreb in Europe, and winning six more league matches in a row, with Manuel Bento going unbeaten in the league for 1080 minutes. In late October, Benfica visited Porto at Estádio das Antas, losing by 2–1, their first in the league. They recovered from the loss and won their next three matches for the Primeira Divisão, creating a four-point lead at the front. They also beat Sporting in the second leg of the Supertaça de Portugal and won their first Supertaça. In the Cup Winners' Cup, they progressed to the quarter-finals after knocking out Malmö. On match-day 12, Benfica faced Sporting in Alvalade and drew 1–1, retaining the first place. Three weeks later, they drew again, now with Vitória de Setúbal and finished the first half of the league a week later with a three-point lead.

Benfica started the second half with three consecutive wins, until they were stopped by Penafiel in early February, which shortened their lead over Porto to only two points. They reacted with four more wins in a row, including a home win against Porto on 14 March in the Clássico, which gave them a four-point lead with seven matches to go. At the same time, in the Cup Winners' Cup, Benfica beat Fortuna Düsseldorf 
at home, after a 2–2 away draw, qualifying for the semi-final. March closed with another draw, now with Académico de Viseu, removing a point from their lead over Porto. On 8 April, Benfica met Carl Zeiss Jena for the first leg of the semi-finals, losing 2–0. Four days later, they drew with Vitória de Guimarães, and saw his lead drop to two points with four match-days to go, one of them against Sporting. The European campaign ended on 22 April, with a one-nil win, not enough to overcome the deficit brought from Jena.

Benfica started May with the Derby de Lisboa against Sporting. They drew 1–1 in a match riddled with controversy. Sporting complained of several mistakes by referee Inácio de Almeida and asked for him to be banned for refereeing. Because Porto had also drop points in Penafiel, Benfica kept their two-point lead. A few days later, Benfica faced Jimmy Hagan's Belenenses for the semi-finals of the Portuguese Cup, winning 1–0 and qualifying for the final. They made their second visit to Estádio do Restelo, seven days later, now for the Primeira Divisão. They won by 3–0, with a double from Nené, who secured his first Bola de Prata for league top-scorer. A week later, Benfica thrashed Vitória de Setúbal by 5–1 and confirmed their 24th league title, the first since 1976–77. The celebrations were scared by the violent confrontations between Police and Benfica fans. The league campaign ended with a 2–0 loss against Espinho, which the Portuguese Football Federation turned to a 3–0 loss because Benfica fans had celebrated too soon and invaded the pitch. The season concluded with the Taça de Portugal Final against Porto, where Nené scored a hat-trick in a 3–1 win, with Benfica securing a double. Before leaving, departing President José Ferreira Queimado signed a one-year extension with Baróti.

Competitions

Overall record

Supertaça de Portugal

Primeira Divisão

League table

Results by round

Matches

Taça de Portugal

European Cup Winners' Cup

Preliminary round

First round

Second round

Quarter-finals

Semi-finals

Friendlies

Player statistics
The squad for the season consisted of the players listed in the tables below, as well as staff member Lajos Baróti (manager), Monge da Silva (assistant manager), Fernando Caiado (assistant manager), Gaspar Ramos (Director of Football).

Transfers

In

Out

Out by loan

Notes

References

Bibliography
 
 
 

S.L. Benfica seasons
Benfica
Portuguese football championship-winning seasons